Yuri Ivanovich Babenko (born 2 January 1978) is a Russian former professional ice hockey player and coach. He most notably played for Dynamo Moscow of the Kontinental Hockey League (KHL) and briefly with the Colorado Avalanche of the National Hockey League (NHL).

Playing career
Babenko was drafted by the Colorado Avalanche in 1996 in the 2nd round, 51st overall.  After a season in the Ontario Hockey League for the Plymouth Whalers, Babenko joined the Avalanche organization in 1998.  After three seasons in the American Hockey League for the Hershey Bears, he finally made his NHL debut for Colorado during the 2000–01 NHL season, playing 3 games in all without registering a point.

Babenko spent another year with Hershey before returning to Russia with Dynamo Moscow. He has also played for Khimik Voskresensk, Metallurg Magnitogorsk, and SKA St. Petersburg.

On June 28, 2009, Babenko returned on a one-year contract to former club HC MVD for the 2009–10 season. After scoring 10 point in 35 games and helping MVD advance to the finals, Babenko followed MVD into the merger with Dynamo Moscow, to sign with UHC Dynamo for the 2010–11 season on May 29, 2010.

Coaching career
Following his professional playing career, Babenko moved into the coaching ranks, remaining with Dynamo Moscow as an assistant coach for two seasons. He later served as the head coach of HC Vityaz of the KHL for the 2021–22 season. He joined Ak Bars Kazan coaching ranks as an assistant during the 2022–23 season, and was elevated at interim coach before returning to a assistant role following the hiring of Zinetula Bilyaletdinov.

Career statistics

Regular season and playoffs

International

References

External links
 

1978 births
Colorado Avalanche draft picks
Colorado Avalanche players
HC Dynamo Moscow players
HC Khimik Voskresensk players
Metallurg Magnitogorsk players
HC MVD players
Hershey Bears players
Krylya Sovetov Moscow players
Living people
Sportspeople from Penza
Plymouth Whalers players
Russian ice hockey centres
SKA Saint Petersburg players